There are four main techniques used today in the UK and mainland Europe for copper cladding a building:
 seamed-cladding (typically 0.7mm thick copper sheet on the facade): max 600mm by 4000mm 'seam centres'.
 shingle-cladding (typically made from 0.7mm thick copper sheet): max 600mm by 4000mm 'seam centres'.
 slot-in panels (typically made from 1.0mm thick copper sheet): max 350mm wide for 1.0mm, by nominal 4 m length.
 cassettes (typically made from 1.0mm up to 1.5mm thick copper sheet): largest-format cladding elements, more subframing is needed: can be 900mm x nominal 4000mm length.

When selecting size of a cladding element, take wind-loadings into account, and also consider the standard sizes available of the sheet (or coil) pre-material, to minimise material wastage through off-cuts. This helps to reduce costs.

The choice of which system to use depends on the aesthetic effect required, and building geometry can also have an influence on the choice.

Copper cladding is very durable, lightweight compared to other materials and techniques, and at the end of the building life is also 100% recyclable.

Depending on metal prices, copper may be a very cost-effective cladding and roofing material. With good building design, materials choice and craftsmanship, copper roofing or facade cladding may be cheaper than slates or concrete tiles, especially when one takes into account the lasting colour, durability, maintenance-free and lightweight nature of the cladding.

Because the UK code of practice for "hard metal" cladding (as opposed to lead cladding) is quite old – CP143: part 12 (1970) – the major manufacturers have to provide detailed technical advice and information for architects, designers and builders, and cultivate skilled installers with years of experience to draw on.

Typically, an installer of hard metal roofing and cladding must put in around 8–10 years on-the-job in order to achieve a respectable experience on a work site.

See also
 Copper in architecture: Wall cladding

References

Copper
Building materials
Roofing materials